Paduka Sri Sultan Muhammad Shah ibni al-Marhum Sultan Mu'adzam Shah (died 23 October 1237) was the third Sultan of Kedah. His reign was from 1202 to 1237. The first gold coin used in Kedah had the words "Muhammed Shah" and "Al-Sultan Al-Kedah" on either side.

External links
 List of Sultans of Kedah

Year of birth missing
1237 deaths
13th-century Sultans of Kedah